Asylon is the sixth studio album by Canadian death metal band Neuraxis. It was released on February 15, 2011, by Prosthetic Records.

Track listing

Personnel

Neuraxis
Alex Leblanc – vocals
Rob Milley – guitar
Olivier Pinard – bass
Olivier Beaudoin – drums

Additional musician
Bill Robinson – vocals on "Savior and Destroyer"

Production
Neuraxis – production
Chris Donaldson – production, mixing, sound engineering
Alan Douches – mastering

Additional personnel
Dennis Sibeijn – artwork, layout
Ben Von Wong – photography

References 

2011 albums
Neuraxis (band) albums
Prosthetic Records albums